Football at the 1954 Asian Games was held in Manila, Philippines from 1 to 8 May 1954. All matches took place at the Rizal Memorial Stadium, and were of 80 minutes duration.

Venues

Medalists

Draw
The draw was held one day before the event.

Group A
 
 
 

Group B
 
 
 

Group C
 
 
 

Group D

Squads

Results

Preliminary round

Group A

Group B

Group C

Group D

Knockout round

Semifinals 

 South Korea advanced to the final due to their superior overall goal-average (1.857 to 1.25).

Bronze medal match

Gold medal match

Final standing

References

 Garin, Erik; Morrison, Neil. "Asian Games 1954". RSSSF.

 
1954 Asian Games events
1954
Asia Games
1954 Asian Games